Babel 250 is a South Korean reality television program on tvN, which first aired on July 11, 2016. The show features a cast of four men and three women, all from different countries, who live together as an experiment, speaking their own languages and attempting to create a universal one.  The show's title is loosely based on the story of the Tower of Babel and 250 families of languages currently in use in the world.

On September 27, 2016, the first season ended with Episode 12.

Background
The concept of the show is a global language project showing what happens when six foreigners living together with one native, in South Korea, must create a lingua franca or "common language", by using their own native languages, not just Korean, and not English. The cast members are from South Korea, Brazil, France, Thailand, Russia, Venezuela and China. Only the South Korean member speaks Korean, and only the Thai and Chinese members have visited South Korea. In an interview with Yonhap, Program Director (PD) Lee Won-hyoung said the ultimate goal was to create a "new world" and mentioned the possibility of "unexpected love lines" developing among the cast.

For the first episode they gathered to live in a southern town they called "Babel 250", the real town of Darengyi in Namhae County, along the South Sea. They elect a leader every day, eat their meals together and attempt to work together in community life and mutual understanding. They initially communicate using their own languages, their eyes and other body language. On the second episode the show's many language interpreters assist the cast, via headphones, as they acquaint themselves with each other.

Filming for the show ended the week the second episode was aired.  By that time, South Korean cast member Lee Ki-woo said communicating had become much easier.  He said, "We could tell what the other person wanted just from their eyes and expressions," and, "I began to understand that language and nationality are not that important."

On July 25, 2016, the date of the airing of the third episode, PD Lee said in a press conference that their new language "Babel" was not really possible, adding, "We wanted to show that people can communicate with a limited vocabulary like we do with English when we travel." He said the first three episodes were a struggle for the cast getting to know one another, but they would start forming their new language in the fourth episode.

Cast
Producers selected the cast after three months of searching Google and other social networks. Brazil's Matheus Olivério da Silva Rêgo is a samba dancer whose school would soon perform at the opening and closing ceremonies of the 2016 Summer Olympics. China's Chen Lin is a professional concert planner, whose concerts have included Jackie Chan's. France's Nicolas Portier is an actor. Russia's Angelina is an interior design college major who likes windsurfing and horseback riding. South Korea's Lee Ki-woo is a film, drama and variety show actor. Thailand's Tanon Varaya has investments in real estates, renting and restaurant operations, and has a luxury philosophy. Venezuela's Michelle Marie Bertolini Araque placed second in the Miss Venezuela 2013 beauty pageant and retired from tennis playing after a knee injury.

On August 15, 2016, the date of the airing of the sixth episode, Tanon Varaya had to leave the show midway for health reasons, which he shared in a videotaped farewell. He was replaced by Thailand's Poompat Iam-samang, a student and drum major at Chulalongkorn University and active on social media with the nickname "Up Poompat." The newcomer was previewed by media as the show's new 'flower boy'.

Current members

2016 episode summary (1–present)

Ratings and reception
On the show's debut, Chosun Ilbo writer Lee Seung-mi pointed out the obvious comparison (and competition) of this new cable television show, with the recently re-organized older cable television show, JTBC's Non-Summit, that also has foreign cast members, and airs on the same night.

In August 2016, PD Lee was contacted by linguist Mark Dingemanse from the Max Planck Institute for Psycholinguistics praising the show's concept and value for human communication and language studies; and proposing a future collaboration.

Cast popularity
In 2016, Angelina Danilova appeared as an actress in Hanhae and Jung Eun-ji's music video "EYESCREAM(여름, 아이스크림)". In 2017, Angelina Danilova appeared as an actress in Eddy Kim's music video "Heart pound(쿵쾅대)". In 2019, Angelina Danilova appeared as an actress in Swings (rapper)'s music video "Usain Bolt(우사인볼트)".

On January 17, 2018, The Corea Image Communication Institute (CICI) selected Angelina Danilova as the 2018 recipient of the Korea Image Flower Stone Award for her work promoting Korea to the world. Fellow recipients that day included Sohn Kyung-shik, chairman of CJ Group, the food and media conglomerate, and Joachim Son-Forget, the first Korean-born member of the French National Assembly. Past award winners of CICI Korea Image Awards include K-pop stars Psy and Rain, maestro Chung Myung-whun, jazz singer Nah Youn-sun, Chinese actress Tang Wei, the Chairman & CEO of Amorepacific Corporation Suh Kyung-bae, Kwangjuyo President Cho Tae-kwon, former Secretary-General of the United Nations Ban Ki-moon, France's Digital Economy Minister Fleur Pellerin, golfer Pak Se-ri, skater Shim Suk-hee, ballet dancer Park Sae-eun, YouTubers Josh Carrott and Ollie Kendal, Samsung Galaxy Android series of smartphones and Google's AlphaGo.

Angelina Danilova made her solo singing debut with the digital single "As You Are" on January 17, 2020.

References

External links
 

2016 South Korean television series debuts
South Korean reality television series
South Korean variety television shows
TVN (South Korean TV channel) original programming
Korean-language television shows
Multiculturalism in South Korea